The Manhattan Piano Trio is a New York-based piano trio formed in 2004. Its current members are violinist Wayne Lee, cellist Sæunn Thorsteinsdóttir, and pianist Milana Strezeva.

The trio is the winner of the ABC Classic FM Listeners Award at the 2007 Melbourne International Chamber Music Competition, the 2006 Plowman Chamber Music Competition, and the 2007 Yellow Springs Chamber Music Competition.

References

External links
 Official site
 Manhattan Piano Trio page at Marquis Classics

Chamber music groups
Piano trios